The Dead Wedding Guest (German: Der tote Hochzeitsgast) is a 1922 Austrian silent historical drama film directed by Max Neufeld and starring Eugen Neufeld, Karl Ehmann and Carmen Cartellieri. It is based on the poem Don Ramiro by Heinrich Heine, set in Spain.

The film's sets were designed by the art directors Artur Berger, Hans Rouc and Julius von Borsody.

Cast
 Eugen Neufeld as Don Fernando 
 Karl Ehmann as Narr 
 Carmen Cartellieri as Donna Clara 
 Max Neufeld as Don Ramiro 
 Josef Recht as König 
 Midy Elliot as Knappe Don Ramiros 
 Eugen Preiß as Vertrauter 
 Pauline Schweighofer as Mutter Donna Claras 
 Eduard Selder as Vater Don Ramiros

References

Bibliography
 Elisabeth Büttner & Christian Dewald. Das tägliche Brennen: eine Geschichte des österreichischen Films von den Anfängen bis 1945, Volume 1. Residenz, 2002.

External links

1922 films
Austrian silent feature films
Films directed by Max Neufeld
Austrian black-and-white films
1922 drama films
Austrian drama films
Films based on poems
Films set in Spain
Silent drama films
1920s German-language films